Dietrich Stoyan (born 1940, Germany) is a German mathematician and statistician who made contributions to queueing theory, stochastic geometry, and spatial statistics.

Education and career
Stoyan studied mathematics at Technical University Dresden; applied research at Deutsches Brennstoffinstitut Freiberg, 1967 PhD, 1975 Habilitation. Since 1976 at TU Bergakademie Freiberg, Rektor of that university in 1991—1997; he became famous by his statistical research of the diffusion of euro coins in Germany and Europe after the introduction of the euro in 2002.

Research

Queueing Theory
Qualitative theory, in particular inequalities, for queueing systems and related stochastic models. The books
D. Stoyan: Comparison Methods for Queues and other Stochastic Models. J. Wiley and Sons, Chichester, 1983 and
A. Mueller and D. Stoyan: Comparison Methods for Stochastic Models and Risks, J. Wiley and Sons, Chichester, 2002

report on the results. The work goes back to 1969 when he discovered the monotonicity of the GI/G/1 waiting times with respect to the convex order.

Stochastic Geometry
Stereological formulae, applications for marked point process, development of stochastic models. Successful joint work with Joseph Mecke led to the first exact proof of the fundamental stereological formulae.

The book Stochastic Geometry and its Applications, by D. Stoyan, W.S. Kendall and J. Mecke reports on the results. The book of 1995 is the key reference for applied stochastic geometry.

Spatial Statistics
Statistical methods for point processes, random sets and many other random geometrical structures such as fibre processes. Results can be found in the 1995 book on stochastic geometry and in the book, Fractals, Random Shapes and Point Fields by D. and H. Stoyan. (J. Wiley and Sons, Chichester, 1994).

A particular strength of Stoyan is second-order methods.

At the moment Dietrich Stoyan is working (together with three colleagues) for a new book on point process statistics. He used  packings of hard spheres as models for materials with the aim to solve  mechanical problems for random heterogeneous materials.

Stoyan is very active in demonstrating non-mathematicians and  non-statisticians the potential of statistical and stochastic geometrical methods. In particular, he coorganized together 
with Klaus Mecke conferences where physicists, geometers and  statisticians met. See the books
Mecke Klaus R. and Stoyan D. (eds.): Statistical Physics and Spatial Statistics. Lecture Notes in Physics 554, Springer-Verlag, 2000 and
Mecke Klaus R. and Stoyan D. (eds.): Morphology of Condensed Matter. Lecture Notes in Physics 600, Springer-Verlag, 2002.

External links
Homepage

1940 births
Living people
German statisticians
Spatial statisticians
Scientists from Freiberg
Members of the German Academy of Sciences at Berlin
TU Dresden alumni
Academic staff of the Freiberg University of Mining and Technology
Probability theorists
German mathematicians
Members of Academia Europaea